The 1961 Gotham Bowl was a college football postseason bowl game between the Utah State Aggies and the Baylor Bears.

Background
For the second straight year, the Aggies were champion of the Mountain States Conference. The Bears had finished tied for 6th in the Southwest Conference. Both teams were making bowl games for the 2nd straight year. This became the inaugural Gotham Bowl after attempts to invite schools such as Syracuse and Holy Cross to last year's game failed, leaving the bowl makers to cancel the game and wait for 1961.

Game summary
Baylor – Bull 14 yard touchdown run (Choate kick)
Baylor – Choate 22 yard field goal
Utah State – Turner 32 yard field goal
Baylor – Trull 2 yard touchdown run (Choate kick) 
Baylor – Plumb 38 yard touchdown pass from Trull (Choate kick)
Utah State – Munson 4 yard touchdown run (run failed)

Ronnie Bull scored on a 14-yard run to give the Bears a 7–0 lead as the first quarter expired, all set up by an Aggie fumble. Carl Choate added in a field goal later in the 2nd to make it 10–3 with 5:28 remaining in the half, which turned out to be the halftime lead. The Aggies narrowed the lead with a 36-yard field goal with 8:47 in the 3rd, but Don Trull increased the lead on a touchdown sneak with 1:22 remaining in the quarter to make it 17–3. Ted Plumb caught a 38-yard pass from Trull to make it 24–3 with 9:48 to go in the game. Munson made the final score 24–9 on his touchdown run, but by then there was only five minutes remaining as Baylor won their first bowl game since 1956. The Aggies turned the ball over eight times, while Don Trull threw 11-of-16 for 116 yards for the Bears. Bull rushed for 61 yards on 13 carries and caught 4 passes for 25 yards.

Aftermath
The Aggies did not reach another bowl game again until 1993. As for the Bears, they next played in a bowl game two years later, in the Bluebonnet Bowl.

Statistics

References

Gotham Bowl
Baylor Bears football bowl games
Utah State Aggies football bowl games
December 1961 sports events in the United States
Gotham Bowl